Leucia nivea is a species of polychaete worm, commonly known as a "scale worm", in the family Polynoidae. This species occurs in the northeastern Atlantic Ocean, the North Sea and the Mediterranean Sea.

Description
The prostomium bears 3 antennae, with a pair of lateral antennae inserted ventrally (beneath prostomium and the median antenna). The anterior margin of the prostomium has a pair of an acute anterior projections, a pair of palps and two pairs of eyes. The first segment bears one or two chaetae and a pair of tentacular cirri on both the dorsal and ventral surfaces. The notochaetae are distinctly thicker than the neurochaetae. Unidentate and bidentate neurochaetae are present.

Taxonomy
This species was first described by the Norwegian zoologist Michael Sars in 1863 as Polynoe nivea but was later transferred to the genus Leucia which was established for it by the Finnish zoologist Anders Johan Malmgren in 1867. For a long time this was thought to be a monotypic taxon, but during a revision of the closely related genus Harmothoe, Harmothoe violacea was reassigned to Leucia violacea.

Distribution
Leucia nivea occurs in the northeastern Atlantic Ocean, the North Sea as far north as the Skagerrak, the British Isles, southwards to the Azores and in the Mediterranean Sea.

References

Phyllodocida
Animals described in 1863
Fauna of the Atlantic Ocean